General Roth may refer to:

Ernst-August Roth (1898–1975), German Luftwaffe lieutenant general
Marshall S. Roth (1901–1995), U.S. Air Force major general
Richard Roth (politician) (born 1950), U.S. Air Force major general

See also
Ludwig Freiherr Roth von Schreckenstein (1789–1858), Prussian Army general of the cavalry